Michael Ray Taylor (May 15, 1945 – November 18, 2015) was an American football offensive tackle in the National Football League (NFL).

College career
Taylor played college football at the University of Southern California and was drafted in the first round (tenth pick overall) of the 1968 NFL Draft by the Pittsburgh Steelers.

Professional career
Taylor played in the National Football League for six seasons.
Taylor worked at Viking Freight System for many years.  He helped make the Sacramento, CA operations team great!  

1945 births
Living people
American football offensive tackles
New Orleans Saints players
Washington Redskins players
St. Louis Cardinals (football) players
Players of American football from San Francisco
USC Trojans football players
Pittsburgh Steelers players